Andalusia is a region in Spain.

Andalusian may also refer to:

Animals
Andalusian chicken, a type of chicken
Andalusian donkey, breed of donkey
Andalusian hemipode, a buttonquail, one of a small family of birds
Andalusian horse, a breed of horse

Other uses
Al-Andalus, a historical state on the Iberian Peninsula
Al-Andalusi, an Arabic attributive title for people from Al-Andalus region
Andalusian people, an ethnic group in Spain centered in the Andalusia region
Andalusian Spanish, a dialect of Spanish (also called andaluz)
Andalusian Arabic, a dialect of the Arabic language
Andalusian cadence, a chord progression in music theory
An Andalusian Dog, the English title of the film Un chien andalou

See also

Andalusi (disambiguation)
Andalusia (disambiguation)

Language and nationality disambiguation pages